(or) is an early collection of German folk stories retold in a satirical style by Johann Karl August Musäus, published in five volumes between 1782 and 1787.

Stories

Publication and translation 
 was first published in five volumes between 1782 and 1787 by C. W. Ettinger in Gotha, Thuringia.

It has been reprinted many other times in Germany, including 1787–8, 1795–8, 1912, 1965, and 1976.

An abridged version edited by Moritz Müller for children, illustrated by Hermann Vogel, was published in Stuttgart by Thienemann in 1887.

English translations 
The first English translation was Popular Tales of the Germans (1791) by Thomas Beddoes, which contained five of the stories: "Richilda", "The Book of the Chronicles of the Three Sisters", "The Stealing of the Veil", "Elfin Freaks" (""), and "The Nymph of the Fountain". This book was published anonymously, and the translation was traditionally attributed to William Beckford.

In the early nineteenth century, some French translations of the Volksmärchen were translated into English. "The Lost Veil" and "Melechsala" were translated in Tales (1805) from Isabelle de Montolieu's Recueil de contes (1803), and an abridged version of "The Spectre-Barber" ("") was translated in Tales of the Dead (1813) from Jean-Baptiste Benoît Eyriès' Fantasmagoriana (1812).

A number of direct translations were published in the 1820s, as part of an increased British interest in German Romanticist literature. This included two stories in Popular Tales and Romances of the Northern Nations (1823), one of the "Legends of Rübezahl" in Endless Entertainment (1825), "The Elopement" in The Literary Magnet (1825), one story in Thomas Roscoe's The German Novelists (1826), three of the "Legends of Rübezahl" with extensive footnotes in The Odd Volume (1826), with another story in The Odd Volume: Second Series (1827), three stories in Thomas Carlyle's German Romance (1827), and the "Legends of Rubezahl" in Foreign Tales and Traditions (1829). In the 1830s, Julia Emily Gordon completed an unpublished translation of The Books of the Chronicles of the Three Sisters, and a new abridged translation of "The Spectre Barber" was included in The Decameron of the West (1839).

The 1840s saw a revival of interest in German traditions following the marriage of Queen Victoria to Prince Albert of Saxe-Coburg and Gotha in 1840, which may have led to the subsequent new translations of Musäus' work. This included The Three Sisters: A Story (1842), "Libussa" in Tales from the German (1844), three stories in Legends of Rubezahl, and Other Tales (1845), two in The Enchanted Knights; or The Chronicle of the Three Sisters (1845), seven in Select Popular Tales from the German of Musaeus (1845), "The Elopement" in Sharpe's London Magazine (1846), two in The Nymph of the Well and The Barber's Ghost (1848), one appended to Schinderhannes, the Robber of the Rhine (1848), Melechsala (1848), one in Tales of Fairy Land (1849), a light-hearted free verse poem version of the "Chronicles of the Three Sisters" as The Arm! – the Sword! – and the Hour! Or, the Legend of the Enchanted Knights (1850), The Stolen Veil; or, the Tale à la Montgolfier (1850), and two in Libussa, Duchess of Bohemia; also The Man Without a Name (1852).

A number of new translations were published in the 1860s, including The Three Sons-in-Law (1861), Mark Lemon's Legends of Number Nip (1863), and a new translation by him of the "Chronicles of the Three Sisters" in Fairy Tales (1868). A few more followed, such as one in Wonder-World Stories (1877), all five "Legends of Rübezahl" in Number Nip; or the Spirit of the Giant Mountains (1884), Harriet Pinckney Huse's Roland's Squires (1891), "The Treasure Seeker" in Andrew Lang's The Crimson Fairy Book (1903), one Volksmärchen Rübezahl tale in his The Brown Fairy Book (1904), two stories in Magic Casements: A Second Fairy Book (1907), and an abridged version of the first of the "Legends of Rübezahl" in The Greatest Adventure Stories Ever Told (1945).

More recently, Fritz Eichenberg adapted the first of the "Legends of Rübezahl" as Poor Troll (1983), Janet Ritch translated The Elopement (1989), Jack Zipes translated "Libussa" in Spells of Enchantment: The Wondrous Fairy Tales of Western Culture (1991), and Piri Korngold Nesselrod retold the five "Legends of Rübezahl" in Rübezahl: The Adventurous Mountain Spirit (1999).

French translations 
They were also translated into French a number of times, including as Contes populaires des Allemands (1803) by J. Lefèvre, a translation of two of the stories by Isabelle de Montolieu (1803), and another complete translation with an introduction by Charles Paul de Kock (1826) among others.

Notes

English translations

Books

References 

1782 books
1783 books
1784 books
1786 books
1787 books
Book series introduced in 1782
Collections of fairy tales
German folklore